Choqa Balk or Cheqa Balak or Cheqa Balek or Cheqa Belek may refer to:
 Choqa Balk-e Alireza
 Choqa Balk-e Khvajeh Bashi
 Choqa Balk-e Kuchek
 Choqa Balk-e Mohammad Zaman